Sviatlana Mikhailauna Kudzelich (born May 7, 1987 in Pinsk) is a Belarusian long-distance runner. She competed at the 2012 and 2016 Summer Olympics.

Until September 2020, she worked in the Ministry of Emergency Situations as an inspector for training and sports in the sector of ideological work and staffing as a senior lieutenant. During the protests in Belarus on August 18, 2020, together with other Belarusian athletes, she signed an open letter condemning violence in the country and demanding new presidential elections. She was subsequently fired from the Ministry of Emergency Situations and deprived of her salary. She was excluded from the national team too. Her husband and coach Igar Zhavaranak was also repressed by Lukashenko's regime as his contract was not prolonged. However, the couple continued preparing for the 2020 Summer Olympics on their own.

International competitions

References

External links

1987 births
Living people
Belarusian female steeplechase runners
Belarusian female long-distance runners
Sportspeople from Pinsk
Athletes (track and field) at the 2012 Summer Olympics
Athletes (track and field) at the 2016 Summer Olympics
Olympic athletes of Belarus
World Athletics Championships athletes for Belarus
Sportspeople from Brest Region